Stefan Dembiński (30 September 1887 – 27 March 1972) was a Polish general.

He fought in the World War I in the Austro-Hungarian Army, and took part in the Polish Defensive War in 1939. He was the General Inspector of the Armed Forces from 1964 to 1972 in the Polish government in exile.

Honours and awards
 Silver Crosses of the Virtuti Militari
 Grand Cross of the Order of Polonia Restituta (formerly awarded the Knight's Cross)
 Cross of Valour (four times)
 Gold Cross of Merit

1887 births
1972 deaths
Polish generals
Recipients of the Silver Cross of the Virtuti Militari
Grand Crosses of the Order of Polonia Restituta
Recipients of the Cross of Valour (Poland)
Recipients of the Gold Cross of Merit (Poland)